Kolubara-Mačva Zone League (Serbian: Зонска лига Колубарско-Мачванска / Zonska liga Kolubarsko-Mačvanska) is one of the Serbian Zone League divisions, the fourth tier of the Serbian football league system. It is run by the Football Association of West Serbia.

The league was founded in 2018, together with the Podunavlje-Šumadija Zone League, Šumadija-Raška Zone League and West Morava Zone League.

Seasons

Members for 2021–22
The following 14 clubs compete in the Kolubara-Mačva Zone League during the 2021–22 season.

References

External links
 Football Association of Serbia
 Football Association of West Serbia

Serbian Zone League
Sports leagues established in 2018
2018 establishments in Serbia